Jonathan Hill was a professional baseball left fielder and pitcher in the Negro leagues. He played with the Atlanta Black Crackers and St. Louis Stars in 1937.

References

External links
 and Seamheads

Atlanta Black Crackers players
St. Louis Stars (1937) players
Year of birth missing
Year of death missing
Baseball pitchers
Baseball outfielders